Class is a 2017 novel by American author Lucinda Rosenfeld. It is set in the New York City borough of Brooklyn.

Critical reception
According to literary review aggregator Book Marks, the book received mixed reviews from critics.

The novel was included on the list published by the Philadelphia Inquirer of the best books of 2017.

References

2017 American novels
Novels set in Brooklyn
Little, Brown and Company books